Andrew Buckley (born August 20, 1993) is a former professional Canadian football quarterback. He played for the Calgary Stampeders of the Canadian Football League (CFL) for two seasons before announcing his retirement prior to the 2018 CFL season. He was drafted in the seventh round, 63rd overall, by the Stampeders in the 2015 CFL Draft. He played CIS football for the Calgary Dinos where he won two consecutive Hec Crighton Trophy awards in 2014 and 2015.

Background 
Buckley was born in Calgary and spent his high school career playing at Rundle College and then the University of Calgary (Dinos).

Professional career
Buckley was drafted in the seventh round of the 2015 CFL Draft and participated in the Stampeders' 2015 training camp before returning to university to play his final season of CIS football. He re-signed with the Stampeders on January 6, 2016 and made the team's 2016 roster as the third-string quarterback.

Buckley played as a back-up quarterback for the Stampeders in the 2016 Grey Cup and scored a rushing touchdown in the third quarter. He was the first Canadian quarterback to score a touchdown in a Grey Cup since Russ Jackson in 1969. On June 17, 2017, Buckley was named as Calgary's back-up quarterback, by head coach Dave Dickenson after the departure of Drew Tate. Buckley announced his retirement from professional football on May 7, 2018 after being accepted into medical school at the University of Calgary. His parents are both doctors and he always wanted to be one, as well.

References

External links
Calgary Stampeders bio

1993 births
Living people
Players of Canadian football from Alberta
Canadian football quarterbacks
Calgary Dinos football players
Calgary Stampeders players
Canadian football people from Calgary